Ibn El-balad (aliases: The Noble Man or The Urchin or The Son of the Country, Egyptian Arabic: إبن البلد translit: Ibn El-balad) is a 1942 Egyptian film starring Mahmoud Zulfikar, Aziza Amir and directed by Stephan Rosti.

Plot 
A contractor forces his daughter Fathia (Aziza Amir) to marry Azmi Bey (Mahmoud El-Meliguy), who covets her money while the other covets his money. Fathia gets to know the engineer Mahmoud (Mahmoud Zulfikar), whose workshop was lost in the Scandinavian raids. Mahmoud can run the factories that she inherited from her father when they were idle. Azmi pretends to be keen on his wife's money. When he senses that he is almost losing her, Fathia asks for a divorce, and after much of trouble, she gets divorced and finally marries Mahmoud, the love of her life.

Primary cast 

 Mahmoud Zulfikar
 Aziza Amir
 Mahmoud El-Meliguy
 Bishara Wakim
 Stephan Rosti
 Dawlat Abyad
 Zuzu Shakib
 Ferdoos Mohammed
 Mohsen Sarhan
 Mohammed Tawfik
 Scheherazade
 Ramses Naguib
 Mohamed Kamel
 Abdel Hamid Zaki

References

External links 

 Ibn el-balad on elCinema

 

1942 films
Films directed by Mahmoud Zulfikar
1940s Arabic-language films
Egyptian drama films
Egyptian black-and-white films